The DrumKAT is in a class of MIDI percussion controllers which also includes the DrumKAT Turbo, DrumKAT EZ (discontinued), DrumKAT DK10, TrapKAT and MalletKAT.  DrumKAT was first produced by KAT, Inc (Chicopee, MA).  The current manufacturer is Alternate Mode, Inc (also of Chicopee, MA).

Description
Control Surface: 10 velocity-sensitive gum-rubber pads have force-sensing resistors (FSR) which detect and convert mechanical energy into electrical signals.

Controller: Any object can be used to strike the pads.

References

External links
 Manufacturer web page

Drum machines